There are at least 23 named lakes and reservoirs in Custer County, Montana.

Lakes
 Cook Lake, el. 
 Scanlan Lake, el.

Reservoirs
 Branum Lake, el. 
 Corny Coulee Reservoir, el. 
 Corral Creek Reservoir, el. 
 Dead Cow Reservoir, el. 
 Hall Reservoir, el. 
 Hamlick Reservoir, el. 
 Hay Creek Reservoir, el. 
 Jones Reservoir, el. 
 Love Reservoir, el. 
 McFarland Reservoir, el. 
 Morgan Creek Reservoir, el. 
 Noble Reservoir, el. 
 Noble Reservoir, el. 
 Physic Creek Reservoir, el. 
 Pine Hill Reservoir, el. 
 Pine Hills Reservoir, el. 
 Shoemaker, el. 
 Spotted Eagle Lake, el. 
 Tepee Butte Reservoir, el. 
 Willie Reservoir, el. 
 Witcher Reservoir, el.

See also
 List of lakes in Montana

Notes

Bodies of water of Custer County, Montana
Custer